Duncan James (born Duncan Inglis, 7 April 1978) is an English singer and actor. He became widely known in 2001 as a member of the boy band Blue and later for playing Ryan Knight in the British soap opera Hollyoaks.

Early life
James grew up an only child in Dorset and was raised primarily by his mother Fiona Inglis and grandparents after his father abandoned his mother before he was born. He was raised a "strict Catholic" and educated at Dumpton School (where his grandfather worked as a music teacher), Milldown School (Blandford Forum), Corfe Hills School (Broadstone), and Sidmouth College (East Devon). At the age of 15 he played Puck in A Midsummer Night's Dream. He played Dr Watson in Sherlock Holmes for Sidmouth Youth Theatre.

Career

2000–2005: Career with Blue

James, along with Antony Costa, convinced Lee Ryan and Simon Webbe in early 2000 to form the group Blue. Blue's R&B-influenced pop allowed the group to achieve commercial success in the United Kingdom and many other countries, including Ireland, Portugal, Belgium, Italy, France, Australia and New Zealand. The band released their debut single "All Rise" in May 2001 and it reached No. 4 on the UK Singles Chart. Their follow up single, "Too Close", was released in August 2001 peaking at No. 1 on the UK Singles Chart. They went on to achieve a second number one in November with the ballad "If You Come Back". The album All Rise was released in time for Christmas and reached number one on the UK Albums Chart, eventually selling in excess of 1.8 million albums in the UK. The final single from the album, "Fly By II", reached No. 6 in March 2002.

Their second studio album, One Love, was released in October 2002; it entered the UK Albums Chart at No. 1 and sold more than 150,000 copies. Three singles were released from the album: "One Love", which peaked at No. 3, "Sorry Seems to Be the Hardest Word", featuring vocals from Elton John, which peaked at No. 1, and "U Make Me Wanna", which peaked at No. 4. Their third studio album, Guilty, was released in autumn 2003; it too entered the UK Albums Chart at No. 1, and sold 100,000 copies in the week of release. The album spawned four singles, including "Guilty", which peaked at No. 2, "Signed, Sealed, Delivered I'm Yours", featuring vocals from Stevie Wonder and Angie Stone, which peaked at No. 11, "Breathe Easy", which peaked at No. 4, and "Bubblin'", which peaked at No. 9.

Two compilation albums, Best of Blue and 4ever Blue, were released in 2004 and  2005 respectively. 4ever Blue included three tracks only previously performed in Japan: "The Gift", "It's Alright" and "Elements". By the indication of the album booklet, a live version of "Lonely This Christmas" from CD:UK was intended to be track seven on the album; however, this was removed from the track listing for unknown reasons. The album was available in several European countries, as well as Japan, Thailand and China; however, it was a commercial failure, and failed to chart anywhere. The album was not released in the UK, despite copies being widely available.

2006–2010: Future Past, stage and television
James returned to the music scene in May 2006 with his solo single "Sooner or Later", releasing the video in early May and planning to release the single commercially on 5 June 2006. The video reached No. 2 on The Box and No. 5 on The Hits. However, the single was no commercial success and entered the British charts at No. 35, before slipping down to No. 72 in its second week. "Can't Stop a River" was James's next single. Released on 21 August 2006, the track only reached No. 59 in the UK and No. 97 in Ireland. In continental Europe, where "Can't Stop a River" was released a day earlier than in the UK, it similarly proved unpopular, dropping out of the singles charts in many countries such as France, Turkey, Germany, and Belgium. James' album also fell short, selling less than 1,000 copies in the UK in its first week (and failing to reach the Top 50). The album sold a total of 412,350 copies around the world.

Although his debut album Future Past did not do as well as hoped (except in Italy, where it reached No. 2 on the chart and was certified platinum for shipments of 80,000 copies), on 2 February 2007, music channel B4 premièred the video for "Amazed", his new single which was scheduled to be released 12 March 2007. However, there was once again a lack of interest. The release was cancelled and James was dropped from his recording contract. He has since announced he has quit his solo career. In 2007 he appeared in the West End production of Chicago. He completed ten more weeks in Chicago from 10 December 2007 until 9 February 2008. He appeared in an episode of The Bill entitled "The Morning After", which aired on 1 January 2009. It was confirmed in February 2009 that James had been selected to replace Denise Van Outen as presenter of Grease: The School Musical, the sequel to Hairspray: The School Musical. Filming commenced in early 2009.

In May 2009, James announced the UK's voting in the Eurovision Song Contest. He presented Hannah-Oke on Disney Channel UK, a singing and dancing contest based on the popular Disney TV series Hannah Montana. He also appeared on Celebrity Are You Smarter Than A 10 Year Old? and raised £10,000 for his charities. In 2006, James appeared with the other members of the boyband Blue on 26 June episode of Ministry of Mayhem, where James and the other band members were all hypnotised by UK stage hypnotist David Days.

James has worked occasionally as a television presenter, having presented the 95.8 Capital FM's Party in the Park for the Prince's Trust (2003 and 2004), and ITV2's coverage of the TV series Soapstar Superstar, along with Jayne Middlemiss. His other presenting work includes Pop City Live, Variety Club Showbusiness Awards 2004, T4 Movie Special: Spider-Man 2, Record of the Year: Downloaded and GMTV's Entertainment Today.

He took part on ITV1's Dancing on Ice in 2007, when he made it to the grand final alongside rugby player Kyran Bracken and actress Clare Buckfield. He came third in the contest, although was unable to perform his Bolero performance. In 2007, James played himself in the pilot episode of Plus One, which was part of Channel 4's Comedy Showcase. A full series was broadcast in 2009, in which he played a broad caricature of himself called "Duncan From Blue". He made an appearance on a new show for Sky One, Guinness World Records Smashed, performing with Festival4Stars contestants. It aired in November 2008. In 2008 he became an Ambassador of Festival4Stars talent competition after he judged a national final. James was cast as one of the leads in the musical Legally Blonde (adapted from the film Legally Blonde) as it transferred from Broadway to London's West End in December 2009. He played opposite Sheridan Smith as Elle, and Aoife Mulholland as Brooke. In December 2009, James appeared as Warner Huntington III in the West End production of Legally Blonde. He appeared as a celebrity guest on 14 August 2009 on Daily Cooks Challenge.

In 2010, James presented the quiz show Scream if You Know the Answer! where the contestants have to answer questions whilst on rollercoasters. In July 2010 he was a judge on Don't Stop Believing, a talent show for choirs. He has his own radio show on 95.8 Capital FM, every Sunday from 7–10 pm.

2011–present: Return with Blue
The band represented the UK at the 2011 Eurovision Song Contest in Düsseldorf with the song "I Can" coming in 11th place with 100 points. Blue released their fourth studio album, Roulette on 25 January 2013 with "Hurt Lovers" as the lead single. On 21 February 2013, it was confirmed that the group would be joining The Big Reunion, a TV series in which six groups from the past, including Liberty X, Atomic Kitten and 5ive, reform for a one-off gig. Beginning in May 2013, the group were to tour Great Britain and Ireland with the other groups in The Big Reunion concert series. On 27 March 2013 the group announced they would embark on their first headlining tour later on in the year, their first tour in nearly ten years. On Sunday 29 May 2022 James performed at Durham Pride 2022 as the headline act.

Personal life
According to an interview he gave to Gabby Logan on BBC Radio 5 Live on 28 July 2007, he is a great-grandson of Herbert Chapman, who managed the Arsenal football team during the inter-war years.

He defined himself as bisexual in an interview with the News of the World on 12 July 2009. James came out privately as gay to fellow band member Simon Webbe in 2012. In an interview in 2014, James specified that he still has sex with women but identifies as a gay man, clarifying: "Regardless of whether I sleep with women or not, I'm still sleeping with men so I'm gay. So I'm still attracted to women, I could still easily sleep with a woman". In July 2017, as he appeared in public for the first time with his new boyfriend at that time, James said that coming out was the "best thing he ever did" after years of "living a lie". In May 2019, in response to a question about what being gay meant to him now, James stated, "It shouldn't really mean anything to people these days. You are who you are. We should lose the labelling, really. Being who you are is good enough, and whatever you are, people should be fine with that. Let's just all get along and let's all be happy." In July 2019, James publicly released pictures of him with his current boyfriend, Rodrigo Reis, adding that he is "proud to be gay". In October 2019, James featured in two episodes of First Dates Hotel in which he had his first public date while openly gay, with 38-year-old Portuguese native, João. 

James has a daughter, Tianie Finn, who was born in February 2005, with former girlfriend Claire Grainger whom he dated from 2002 to 2005. From 2008 to 2009, James dated Tara Palmer-Tomkinson. In 2013, James stated that he would like to have another child with Grainger.

Filmography

Discography

Studio albums

Singles

Promotional singles

References

Bibliography
 [ AllMusic's description of Blue]
 "Life of Ryan", "The Guardian", 3 July 2005, retrieved 17 May 2006
 "Duncan James slams ex-bandmates, "ContactMusic", 1 May 2006, retrieved 17 May 2006
 Everyhit.com Lists chart ranks for UK singles
 "James vows to be a good dad", "ContactMusic", 1 December 2004, retrieved 17 May 2006
 "When does the fun start?" by Zoe Williams, The Guardian, 4 October 2003, retrieved 17 May 2006

External links

 

1978 births
Living people
21st-century English male actors
21st-century English male singers
Blue (English band) members
English Roman Catholics
English male television actors
English gay actors
English gay musicians
Gay singers
Gay songwriters
English television personalities
British LGBT broadcasters
LGBT Roman Catholics
English LGBT singers
English LGBT songwriters
People from Salisbury
Musicians from Wiltshire
British contemporary R&B singers
Innocent Records artists